Russian football teams have taken part in European competitions since the 1966–67 season, as part of the Soviet Union until the 1991–92 season, and as an independent country from then on.

Active competitions

European Cup / UEFA Champions League

UEFA Cup / Europa League

UEFA Europa Conference League

Defunct competitions

UEFA Cup Winners' Cup

UEFA Intertoto Cup

<div>
Notes
  Note 1: No club was selected by the Russian Football Union to participate in the tournament during that season.

UEFA coefficient and ranking
For the 2022–23 UEFA competitions, the associations were allocated places according to their 2021 UEFA country coefficients, which take into account their performance in European competitions from 2016–17 to 2020–21. In the 2021 rankings used for the 2022–23 European competitions, Russia's coefficient points total is 38.382 and is ranked by UEFA as the 32nd best association in Europe out of 55.
 6  48.549
 7  39.200
 8  38.832
 9  36.500
 10  35.825
 Full list

UEFA country coefficient history
, Source UEFA

<div>
Notes

References

 
European football clubs in international competitions